Mladenovac is a village situated in Mladenovac municipality in Serbia.

See also
Populated places of Serbia

References

Populated places in Serbia